The Kennett Consolidated School District (abbreviated as KCSD) is a large, suburban, public school district serving portions of Chester County, Pennsylvania. It is centered on the borough of Kennett Square and also incorporates Kennett Township, New Garden Township, and the southern portion of East Marlborough Twp. According to 2000 federal census data, it serves a resident population of 27,124.

The district operates five schools: Greenwood Elementary, Bancroft Elementary, Mary D. Lang Kindergarten Center, New Garden Elementary, Kennett Middle School, and Kennett High School.

Extracurriculars
The district offers a variety of clubs, activities and sports to pupils in the high school and middle school.

Sports
The District funds:

Boys
Baseball
Basketball
Cross Country
Football
Golf
Indoor Track and Field
Lacrosse
Soccer
Swimming and Diving
Tennis
Track and Field
Wrestling	

Girls
Basketball
Cross Country
Field Hockey
Indoor Track and Field
Lacrosse
Soccer (Fall)
Softball
Swimming and Diving
Tennis
Track and Field
Volleyball

Middle School Sports

Boys
Baseball
Basketball
Cross Country
Football
Lacrosse
Soccer
Track and Field
Wrestling	

Girls
Basketball
Cross Country
Field Hockey
Lacrosse
Softball
Soccer
Track and Field
Volleyball

According to PIAA directory July 2012

References

School districts in Chester County, Pennsylvania